Dylan Alexander Soedjasa (born 13 January 1995) is a New Zealand badminton player. In 2013, he won silver medal at the Oceania Junior Badminton Championships in the mixed team event. In the individuals event, he won gold in the boys' doubles and bronze in the singles event. In 2016, he won the gold medal at the Oceania Championships in the men's team event. In 2017, he was the runner-up at the 2017 Nouméa International tournament in the men's singles and mixed doubles event partnered with Susannah Leydon-Davis.

Achievements

Oceania Championships 
Mixed doubles

Oceania Junior Championships 
Boys' singles

Boys' doubles

BWF International Challenge/Series (2 runners-up) 
Men's singles

Mixed doubles

  BWF International Challenge tournament
  BWF International Series tournament
  BWF Future Series tournament

References

External links 
 

Living people
1995 births
People from Takapuna
New Zealand male badminton players
Sportspeople from Auckland